Anthony Burns was an escaped slave.

Anthony Burns may also refer to:
Anthony Burns (politician)
Anthony Scott Burns (born 1977), Canadian filmmaker and artist
M. Anthony Burns (born 1942), American businessman
Tony Burns (born 1944), footballer
Tony Burns (boxing), former amateur boxer and boxing trainer

See also
Anthony Byrne (disambiguation)